Ontari Poratam ( Lonely Battle) is a 1989 Telugu-language film directed by K. Raghavendra Rao, produced by D.V.S.S. Prasad and Sri Krishna Prasanna Enterprises. It stars Venkatesh, Farah (credited as Swetha) and Rupini , with music composed by Chakravarthy. The film was recorded as hit at the box office. T he movie was dubbed in Tamil as Jeyithu Kattuvein.

Plot
Raja (Venkatesh), an uneducated intelligent guy, works as a laborer. Priyanka (Swetha), daughter of Sudarshan Rao (Satyanarayana), a multimillionaire, has a lot of arrogance and ego. Raja Rajeswari Devi (Jayasudha), Priyanka's lecturer always instigates her ego. Indu (Rupini), an unemployed educated woman lives in a small room opposite to Priyanka's house along with two more unemployed educated guys, Scientist (Sudhakar) and Engineer (Guru). Indu and her gang meet Raja and they all become good friends. Raja and Priyanka always have silly fights and quarrels with each other.

One day, Raja Rajeswari Devi makes a bet with Priyanka that resolves the problem at a shopping complex, Priyanka takes Indu's help. At the same time, Raja requires money for the operation of his friend Siddappa's (Chittibabu) mother. So, Raja says he will resolve the problem if Priyanka is ready to pay the amount. Raja solves the problem very intellectually, but Priyanka cheats him, which leads to her death. In anger, Raja insults Priyanka before everybody by kissing her. For that, Sudarshan Rao clamps Raja and Priyanka beats him very badly, then Raja throws a challenge to Sudarshan Rao that he will become greater businessman than him within a span of 4 years and the bet is if Raja wins the challenge, Sudarshan Rao should make Priyanka's marriage with him Sudarshan Rao accepts the challenge. All these things are silently observed by Raja Rajeswari Devi and she decides to help him. So, She starts teaching him regarding the life and brings him up as a well-educated person. Raja grows step-by-step with his intelligence and hard work and almost reaches up to the heights of Sudarshan Rao.

At the same time, Sudarshan Rao finds out that person behind Raja is Raja Rajeswari Devi, which gives a shock to him because there is vengeance between them, and one more shocking incident, Sudarshan Rao is that he is none other than Raja's mother Bhagyalakshmi's (Annapurna) brother, his maternal uncle, who has cheated Raja's father and thrown their family on the roads. Meanwhile, Priyanka also understands Raja's good heart and starts loving him. All these things take Sudarshan Rao to a breathless situation, to rescue himself he brings a person, Sivangi Sivaramakrishna (Mohan Babu) from jail. Once Sivaramakrishna insults Raja & Raja Rajeswari Devi on the public dais and declares Raja Rajeswari Devi as his wife. Raja questions Raja Rajeswari Devi what actually happened, then she reveals the truth; once Sudarshan Rao was a college chairman where Raja Rajeswari Devi worked as a lecturer, she exposed all his illegal activities in college and he was arrested. To take revenge, he used her husband Sivaramakrishna as a henchman and tried to molest her, so there she takes a pledge that she won't tie her hair until she sees Sudarshan Rao's end, and she sent Sivaramakrishna to jail. Listening to all this, Raja decides to fulfill his teacher's pledge, so he collects all the proofs against Sudarshan Rao, which collapse his entire dynasty. Simultaneously, Sudarshan Rao and Sivaramakrishna kidnap Raja Rajeswari Devi and Indu, and Raja protects them. Finally, Raja wins in his challenge and fulfills his teacher's pledge.

Cast

Venkatesh as Raja
 Priyanka
Rupini as Indu
Satyanarayana as Sudarshan Rao
Mohan Babu as Sivangi Sivaramakrishna
Jayasudha as Raja Rajeswari Devi
Brahmanandam as Bangarayah
Sudhakar as Kesava Scientist
Anand Raj as Rowdy Govinda Yadav
Prasanna Kumar as Yogesh
Guru as Engineer
Sivaji Raja as Bose
Chittibabu as Siddappa
Mada as Shopping Complex Owner
Chidatala Appa Rao as Hotel Owner
P. J. Sarma as Minister
Malladi Satyanarayana as House Owner
Bhimeswara Rao as Doctor 
Annapurna as Bhagyalakshmi
Shubha as Sudarshan Rao's Wife
Mamatha as Mangi
Dubbing Janaki as Siddapa's Mother

Soundtrack

Music composed by Chakravarthy. Music released on LEO Audio Company.

References

1989 films
1980s Telugu-language films
Films scored by K. Chakravarthy
Films directed by K. Raghavendra Rao